Polyrically Uncorrect is the tenth studio album, and fourteenth album release overall, by American country music parodist Cledus T. Judd. It was released on June 30, 2009 via E1 Music. It includes the singles "Waitin' on Obama", "Garth Must Be Busy" and "(If I Had) Kellie Pickler's Boobs". The album includes guest vocals from Ashton Shepherd, Ronnie Dunn, Jamey Johnson, Terry Eldredge (of The Grascals), Colt Ford and Daryle Singletary. Chris Neal of Country Weekly gave the album three stars out of five, citing the Ronnie Dunn collaboration as a standout track.

Track listing
"Polyrically Uncorrect" – 3:23
duet with Ashton Shepherd
parody of "Politically Uncorrect" by Gretchen Wilson and Merle Haggard
"Garth Must Be Busy" – 4:00
duet with Ronnie Dunn
parody of "God Must Be Busy" by Brooks & Dunn
"(If I Had) Kellie Pickler's Boobs" – 2:51
featuring Terry Eldredge (of The Grascals) and Jamey Johnson
"Waitin' on Obama" – 3:44
parody of "Waitin' on a Woman" by Brad Paisley
"Cooter" – 3:13
"Washing Airplanes" – 3:56
parody of "Watching Airplanes" by Gary Allan
"Tailgatin'" – 3:09
duet with Colt Ford
"Hard Time" – 3:15
parody of "Good Time" by Alan Jackson
"Merger on Music Row" – 4:24
duet with Daryle Singletary
parody of "Murder on Music Row" by George Strait and Alan Jackson
"Dang It, I'm Vixen" – 3:13
"Christmas in Rehab" – 3:04

Personnel
Steve Brewster – drums
Ricky Cobble – engineer, mixing
Kevin "Swine" Grantt – bass guitar
Paul Grosso – design, creative director
Rob Hajacos – fiddle
Wes Hightower – background vocals
Jeff King – electric guitar
Matt Legge – assistant engineer
Randy LeRoy – mastering
Steve Marcantonio – mixing
Gary Prim – piano
Chuck Rhodes – executive producer
John B. Sparks – assistant engineer
Bryan Sutton – acoustic guitar

Chart performance

Album

Singles

References

External links
[ Polyrically Uncorrect] at Allmusic

2009 albums
E1 Music albums
Cledus T. Judd albums
2000s comedy albums